The 2021–22 Nemzeti Bajnokság I/A season, also known as Tippmix Női NB I/A for sponsorship reasons, is the 85th season of the Nemzeti Bajnokság I/A, the highest professional basketball league in Hungary. Falco Vulcano is the defending champion. It started on 25 September 2021 with the first round of the regular season and will end in 23 April 2022 with the last game of the finals.

Regular season

League table

Playoffs
Quarterfinals semifinals and the third place series were played in a best-of-three format, the finals were played in a best-of-five format. The higher seeded team playing the first, third and fifth (if it was necessary) game at home.

Quarterfinals

|}

Semifinals

|}

Third place series

|}

Finals

|}

Game 1

Game 2

Game 3

Final standings

Statistics

Number of teams by counties and regions

Hungarian clubs in European competitions

See also

 2022 Magyar Kupa

References

External links
 Hungarian Basketball Federaration 

Nemzeti Bajnokság I/A (women's basketball) seasons
Hungarian
Nemzeti Bajnoksag Women